Ali Moore (born 1964) is an Australian TV journalist and radio broadcaster.

Career 

Moore began her career in 1987 as a cadet for the Australian Broadcasting Corporation (ABC), where she was active in a number of programmes.

In 1996 she moved to the Nine Network, where she was a reporter and eventually presenter of Business Sunday. Shortly after Moore left Business Sunday merged into the Sunday program.

She was also a fill-in host for Today on Saturday and filled in for Tracy Grimshaw from 1999 until 2003 on Today. The morning after the 11 September attacks in New York, Ali co-hosted the program from 6am until 11am bringing in the latest information from the developing story alongside Steve Liebmann.

With Business Sunday's imminent demise in 2006, she opted to leave the network and returned to the ABC. She has previously hosted Lateline Business, and is also a relief presenter on ABC Radio Melbourne and The 7.30 Report on ABC TV.

Moore presented Mornings on ABC Radio Melbourne while Jon Faine was on long service leave for 5½ months in 2008.

In July 2010, Moore began hosting Afternoon Live on ABC News 24. In December 2010, it was announced that Moore would move to Lateline in 2011, filling the vacancy left by Leigh Sales and as a result she left ABC News 24.

Ali later became a freelance producer and presenter for BBC World News, based in Singapore working on Newsday and Asia Business Report.

In 2017, she returned to Australia where she remains a fill in on News Breakfast when Virginia Trioli is away and on ABC Radio Melbourne.

References 

1964 births
ABC News (Australia) presenters
Living people